Joo Jin-mo (born February 26, 1958) is a South Korean actor.

Filmography

Film

Television series

References

External links 
 Joo Jin-mo at Huayi Brothers 
 
 
 

1958 births
Living people
20th-century South Korean male actors
21st-century South Korean male actors
South Korean male television actors
South Korean male film actors